Sonatas is a 1959 Mexican-Spanish historical drama film directed by Juan Antonio Bardem and starring María Félix, Francisco Rabal and Aurora Bautista. It premiered at the Venice Film Festival. It is based on novels written by the Spanish author Ramón del Valle-Inclán.

The film's sets were designed by the art directors Francisco Canet and Gunther Gerszo. Some location shooting took place in Galicia as well as various locations around Mexico. The film was shot in Eastmancolor.

Cast
 María Félix as La Niña Chole 
 Francisco Rabal as Marqués Javier de Bradomín 
 Aurora Bautista as Concha 
 Fernando Rey as Capitán Casares 
 Carlos Rivas as Juan Guzmán 
 Ignacio López Tarso as Jefe de guerrilleros 
 Carlos Casaravilla as Conde de Brandeso 
 David Reynoso as Teniente Elizondo 
 Nela Conjiu as Joven loca 
 Manuel Alexandre as Teniente Andrade 
 Ada Carrasco as Nana 
 José Torvay as Segundo sargento 
 Matilde Muñoz Sampedro as Candelaria 
 Rafael Bardem as Juan Manuel Montenegro 
 Enrique Lucero as Militar prisionero 
 José María Prada as Molinero 
 Micaela Castejón as Madre abadesa 
 Manuel Dondé as Campesino 
 Noé Murayama as Teniente Gaviño 
 Xan das Bolas as Tercer centinela 
 José Chávez as Primer sargento 
 Manuel Peiró as Estudiante 
 Manuel Arbó as Coronel 
 Josefina Serratosa as Molinera 
 Edmundo Barbero as Hermano Lope 
 Porfiria Sanchíz as Bruja 
 Roberto Meyer as Macario Salas, viejo prisionero 
 Mario Berriatúa as El Rubio 
 Rogelio 'Frijolitos' Jiménez Pons
 Rufino Inglés as Doctor 
 Agustín Fernández as Guerrillero 
 José Manuel Martín as Primer centinela

References

Bibliography 
 Scott L. Baugh. Latino American Cinema: An Encyclopedia of Movies, Stars, Concepts, and Trends. ABC-CLIO, 2012.

External links 
 

1959 films
1950s historical drama films
Mexican historical drama films
Spanish historical drama films
1950s Spanish-language films
Films directed by Juan Antonio Bardem
Films set in the 19th century
1959 drama films
1950s Mexican films